Norway is divided into 11 administrative regions, called counties (singular , plural ;  from Old Norse: fylki from the word "folk") which until 1918 were known as amter. The counties form the first-level administrative divisions of Norway and are further subdivided into 356 municipalities (kommune,  pl. kommuner / kommunar). The island territories of Svalbard and Jan Mayen are outside the county division and ruled directly at the national level. The capital Oslo is both a county and a municipality.

In 2017, the Solberg government decided to abolish some of the counties and to merge them with other counties to form larger ones, reducing the number of counties from 19 to 11, which was implemented on 1 January 2020. This sparked popular opposition, with some calling for the reform to be reversed. The Storting voted to partly undo the reform on 14 June 2022, with Norway to have 15 counties from 1 January 2024. Three of the newly merged counties, namely Vestfold og Telemark, Viken and Troms og Finnmark, will be dissolved and the old counties they were created from will reemerge. The to-be-reestablished counties will see some minor border changes compared to when they were abolished, as some municipalities were merged across former county borders during the 2020 local government reform (no).

List of counties 
Below is a list of the Norwegian counties, with their current administrative centres. Note that the counties are administered both by appointees of the national government and to a lesser extent by their own elected bodies. The county numbers are from the official numbering system ISO 3166-2:NO, which originally was set up to follow the coastline from the Swedish border in the southeast to the Russian border in the northeast, but with the numbering has changed with county mergers.

The island territories of Svalbard and Jan Mayen lie outside of the county system of Norway. Svalbard is administered by the Governor of Svalbard, and Jan Mayen is administered by the County Governor of Nordland (but not part of Nordland).

Responsibilities and significance
Every county has two main organisations, both with underlying organisations.
 The county municipality (no: Fylkeskommune) has a county council (Norwegian: Fylkesting), whose members are elected by the inhabitants. The county municipality is responsible mainly for some medium level schools, public transport organisation, regional road planning, culture and some more areas.
 The county governor (no: Fylkesmannen) is an authority directly overseen by the Norwegian government. It surveills the municipalities and receives complaints from people over their actions. It also controls areas where the government needs local direct ruling outside the municipalities.

History

Fylke (1st period)
From the consolidation to a single kingdom, Norway was divided into a number of geographic regions that each had its own legislative assembly or Thing, such as Gulating (Western Norway) and Frostating (Trøndelag). The second-order subdivision of these regions was into fylker, such as Egdafylke and Hordafylke. In 1914, the historical term fylke was brought into use again to replace the term amt introduced during the union with Denmark. Current day counties (fylker) often, but not necessarily, correspond to the historical areas.

Fylke in the 10th-13th centuries
Counties (folkland) under the Borgarting, located in Viken with the seat at Sarpsborg:

Rånrike
Vingulmark
Vestfold
Grenland

Counties (first three fylke, last two bilandskap) under the Eidsivating, located in Oplandene with the seat at Eidsvoll:
Raumafylke (Glåmdalen, Romerike, Solør)
Heinafylke (Gjøvik, Hedmarken)
Hadafylke (Hadeland, Land, Toten)
Gudbrandsdal
Østerdal
Counties under the Gulating, located in Vestlandet with the seat at Gulen:

Sunnmærafylke
Firdafylke (Nordfjord, Sunnfjord)
Sygnafylke
Valdres and Hallingdal
Hordafylke
Rygjafylke
Setesdal
Egdafylke

Counties under the Frostating, located in Trøndelag with the seat at Frosta:

Eynafylke
Sparbyggjafylke
Verdælafylke
Skeynafylke
Orkdælafylke
Gauldælafylke
Stjordælafylke
Strindafylke
Naumdælafylke
Nordmærafylke
Romsdælafylke

Counties not attached to a thing:

Jamtaland
Herjedalen
Håløygjafylke
Helgeland
Salten
Lofoten and Vesterålen
Trondenes

Finnmark (including northern Troms), the Faroe Islands, the Orkney Islands, Shetland, the Hebrides, Isle of Man, Iceland and Greenland were Norwegian skattland ("taxed countries"), and did not belong to any known counties or assembly areas.

Syssel

Syssel in 1300
From the end of the 12th century, Norway was divided into several syssel. The head of the syssel was the syslemann, who represented the king locally. The following shows a reconstruction of the different syssel in Norway c. 1300, including sub-syssel where these seem established.

Elvesysle
Rånrike
Borgarsysle (two parts)
Romerike (two parts, "northern" and "southern")
Hedmark (two parts, "northern" and "southern")
Østerdalen
"north of Åmot"
"south of Åmot"
Gudbrandsdalen
"north of Ruste"
"south of Ruste"
Hadeland (later Ringerike, two parts, "northern" and "outer")
Valdres and Hallingdal (two parts)
Numedal and Telemark?
Tverrdalane and Modum?
Oslosysle (northern lut and western lut)
Tønsbergsysle
Skiensysle
Eastern part (later Nedenes)
Robyggjelag
Agder Midtsysla
Lista
Rygjafylke
"north of the fjord"
"south of the fjord"
Hordaland (Nordhordland? and Sunnhordland?)
Hardanger
Voss
Sogn (two parts?)
Sunnfjord
Nordfjord
Sunnmøre
Romsdal
Nordmøre?
Nordmørafylke
Orkdal
Gauldal
Strinda
Herjedalen
Jemtland
Stjørdal
Skogn
Verdal
Sparbu
Eynafylke
Northern part? (later Fosen)
Namdalen
"upper half" (Overhalla)
"lower half (later Njardøy)
Hålogaland (two parts)
Troms?
Finnmark?

Len
From 1308, the term len (plural len) in Norway signified an administrative region roughly equivalent to today's counties. The historic len was an important administrative entity during the period of Dano-Norwegian unification after their amalgamation as one state, which lasted for the period 1536–1814.

At the beginning of the 16th century the political divisions were variable, but consistently included four main len and approximately 30 smaller sub-regions with varying connections to a main len.  Up to 1660 the four principal len were headquartered at the major fortresses Bohus Fortress, Akershus Fortress, Bergenhus Fortress and the fortified city of Trondheim.  The sub-regions corresponded to the church districts for the Lutheran church in Norway.

Len in 1536
Båhus len (later termed Bohuslän after Denmark-Norway ceded it to Sweden by the Treaty of Roskilde in 1658)
Akershus len
Trondheim len
Bergenhus len (which included Northern Norway)

These four principal len were in the 1530s divided into approximately 30 smaller regions. From that point forward through the beginning of the 17th century the number of subsidiary len was reduced, while the composition of the principal len became more stable.

Len in 1660
From 1660 Norway had nine principal len comprising 17 subsidiary len:

Bergenhus len

Len written as län continues to be used as the administrative equivalent of county in Sweden to this day.  Each len was governed by a lenman.

Amt
With the royal decree of 19 February 1662, each len was designated an amt (plural amt) and the lenmann was titled amtmann, from German Amt (office), reflecting the bias of the Danish court of that period.

Amt in 1671
After 1671 Norway was divided into four principal amt or stiftsamt and there were nine subordinate amt:

Akershus amt
Smålenene amt
Brunla amt
Agdesiden amt
Bratsberg amt
Stavanger amt
Bergenhus amt
Halsnøy klostergods
Hardanger amt
Nordlandene amt
Trondheim amt
Romsdalen amt
Vardøhus amt

Amt in 1730
From 1730 Norway had the following amt:

Vardøhus amt
Tromsø amt
Nordlands amt
Nordre Trondhjems amt
Søndre Trondhjems amt
Romsdalen amt
Nordre Bergenhus amt
Søndre Bergenhus amt
Stavanger amt
Lister og Mandals amt
Nedenes amt
Bratsberg amt
Buskerud amt
Oplandenes amt
Hedemarkens amt
Akershus amt
Smaalenenes amt

At this time there were also two counties (grevskap) controlled by actual counts, together forming what is now Vestfold county:
Laurvigen county
Jarlsberg county

Amt in 1760
In 1760 Norway had the following stiftamt and amt:

Akershus stiftamt
Opplands amt
Akershus amt
Smålenenes amt
Laurvigen county
Jarlsberg county
Bratsberg amt (eastern half)
Agdesiden stiftamt
Bratsberg amt (western half)
Nedenes amt
Lister and Mandal amt
Stavanger amt
Bergenhus stiftamt
Romsdal amt (southern half)
Trondheim stiftamt
Romsdal amt (northern half)
Nordlands amt
Vardøhus amt

Fylke (2nd period)

From 1919 each amt was renamed a fylke (plural fylke(r)) (county) and the amtmann was now titled fylkesmann (county governor).

Østfold fylke
Akershus fylke
Oslo fylke
Hedmark fylke
Oppland fylke
Buskerud fylke
Vestfold fylke
Telemark fylke
Aust-Agder fylke
Vest-Agder fylke
Rogaland fylke
Bergen fylke, merged into Hordaland fylke in 1972
Hordaland fylke
Sogn og Fjordane fylke
Møre og Romsdal fylke
Sør-Trøndelag fylke, merged into Trøndelag fylke in 2018
Nord-Trøndelag fylke, merged into Trøndelag fylke in 2018
Trøndelag fylke, created in 2018
Nordland fylke
Troms fylke
Finnmark fylke
The county numbers are from the official numbering system ISO 3166-2:NO, which originally was set up to follow the coastline from the Swedish border in the southeast to the Russian border in the northeast, but the numbering has changed with county mergers. The number 13, 16 and 17 were dropped, and the number 50 was added to account for changes over the years. The lack of a county number 13 is due to the city of Bergen no longer being its own county, and is unrelated to fear of the number 13.

In 2018, Sør-Trøndelag was merged with Nord-Trøndelag into the new county of Trøndelag, and several followed.

Fylke (3rd period)
In 2017 the Norwegian government announced the merge of the existing 19 fylker into 11 new fylker by 2020. As a result, several government responsibilities were transferred to the new regions.

 New fylker
Troms og Finnmark, by merging Finnmark and Troms counties in 2020.
Nordland, no change, same as Nordland county.
Trøndelag, by merging Nord-Trøndelag and Sør-Trøndelag counties in 2018.
Møre og Romsdal, no change, same as Møre og Romsdal county.
Vestland, by merging Hordaland and Sogn og Fjordane counties in 2020.
Rogaland, no change, same as Rogaland county.
Agder, by merging Aust-Agder and Vest-Agder counties in 2020.
Vestfold og Telemark, by merging Vestfold and Telemark counties in 2020.
Innlandet, by merging Hedmark and Oppland counties in 2020.
Viken, by merging Akershus, Buskerud, and Østfold counties in 2020.
Oslo, no change, same as Oslo county.

See also 
Municipalities of Norway
Regions of Norway
Traditional districts of Norway
Metropolitan regions of Norway
Subdivisions of the Nordic countries
Lists of County Governors of Norway

References

Footnotes

Bibliography
 

 
Subdivisions of Norway
Counties
Norway 1
Counties, Norway
Norway geography-related lists
21st-century disestablishments in Norway